Lily Gower, birth name Lilias Mary Gower (5 October 1877 — 29 July 1959) was a Welsh croquet player, a four-time winner of the Women's Championship. She was one of the three women who have won the Open Championship, winning in 1905.

She had won her very first public tournament at Budleigh Salterton, in 1898  and won the Ladies Championship for the next three years. In 1901, she started entering tournaments with men and in that year she won the Open Gold Medal, with a controversy. In semi-final her opponent (a man) accused her of "spooning". This sparkled heated discussions as to whether this was a gentlemanly way to do. 

During her peak she was also three times Open Gold Medalist (contestants being both men and women) and even Men's Gold Medalist. The latter case was a result of confusion in rules: after "Open" and "Women's" were renamed into "Men's" and "Women's", the inadequately modified rules contained a loophole which allowed women to enter the "Men's Gold" contest.

In 1906 she married Reginald CJ Beaton, who was also a leading croquet player.

As an administrator she served on the Council of the Croquet Association between 1939 and 1954.

References

English croquet players
1877 births
1959 deaths